The Latham Baronetcy, of Crow Clump in Walton-upon-Thames in the County of Surrey, was a title in the Baronetage of the United Kingdom.

It was created on 24 May 1919 for Thomas Latham. He was Joint managing Director and Deputy Chairman of Courtaulds and also gave service to the Ministry of Pensions during the First World War. The second Baronet represented Scarborough and Whitby in the House of Commons as a Conservative from 1931 to 1941. The baronetcy became extinct with the death of the 3rd Baronet in 2022.

Latham baronets, of Crow Clump (1919)
 Sir Thomas Paul Latham, 1st Baronet (1855–1931)
 Sir (Herbert) Paul Latham, 2nd Baronet (1905–1955)
 Sir Richard Thomas Paul Latham, 3rd Baronet (1934–2022)

References

 Kidd, Charles, Williamson, David (editors). Debrett's Peerage and Baronetage (1990 edition). New York: St Martin's Press, 1990.
 

Extinct baronetcies in the Baronetage of the United Kingdom